Norbert Kricke (30 November 1922 – 28 June 1984) was a German sculptor.

Born in Düsseldorf, Kricke was a student of Richard Scheibe and Hans Uhlmann at the Hochschule für Bildende Künste in Berlin. He started creating abstract sculptures from 1947, using wires and other materials associated with industry, such as steel, glass and concrete. He was one of the most important artists in the group known as L'Art Informel, and had close links with ZERO and Nouveau Réalisme. From 1959 he worked with Yves Klein and Werner Ruhnau, and after 1972 he taught at the Art Academy of Düsseldorf, where he died.

One of his more famous works is the Water Forest (1957) outside the Gelsenkirchen Opera House (Musiktheater im Revier). He also created wire sculptures for Münster Theatre (1955/56) and fountains for the University of Baghdad. He is generally known for his theories on the use of flowing water in art, shared with the critic John Anthony Thwaites (1909–1981).

Selected exhibitions

 1959 documenta 2 documenta, Kassel
 1964 32. Biennale Venedig, 1964 Biennale Venedig
 1964 documenta 3, documenta, Kassel
 1975 Norbert Kricke, Kunsthalle Düsseldorf
 1980 Norbert Kricke, Josef Albers Museum, Bottrop
 1997 Deutschlandbilder, Martin-Gropius-Bau, Berlin
 1998 Norbert Kricke, Studio A. Otterndorf
 1999 Das Deutsche Informel, Galerie Rothe, Frankfurt
 1999 Norbert Kricke, Museum of Contemporary Art, Skopje
 2000 40 Jahre Orangerie-Reinz, Galerie Orangerie-Reinz, Köln
 2001 Outside the network?, Edith Wahlandt Galerie, Stuttgart
 2003 Gruppe 53, Museum der Stadt Ratingen
 2003 The Spirit of White, Galerie Beyeler, Basel
 2004 Auf Papier, Galerie Neher, Essen
 2005 MULTIPLE RÄUME (2): PARK, Kunsthalle Baden-Baden
 2006 CLASSICAL : MODERN, Daimler Chrysler Contemporary, Berlin
 2006 Full House, Kunsthalle Mannheim
 2006 Rupprecht Geiger / Norbert Kricke, Neues Museum Weimar
 2006 VIP III. Arena der Abstraktion, Museum Morsbroich, Leverkusen
 2006 Was ist Plastik? 100 Jahre – 100 Köpfe, Wilhelm Lehmbruck Museum, Duisburg
 2006–2007 Norbert Kricke Museum, Kunst Palast, Düsseldorf

Works in collections
 Daimler Chrysler Contemporary, Berlin
 Karl Ernst Osthaus-Museum, Hagen
 Kunst aus NRW, Aachen-Kornelimünster
 Museum Abteiberg, Mönchengladbach
 Saarland Museum, Saarbrücken
 SITUATION KUNST Bochum
 Studio A Otterndorf

Bibliography
 John Anthony Thwaites: Norbert Kricke. Thames and Hudson, London 1964.

External links

 Homepage

1922 births
1984 deaths
German sculptors
German male sculptors
Academic staff of Kunstakademie Düsseldorf
20th-century sculptors
Officers Crosses of the Order of Merit of the Federal Republic of Germany